Trachysida aspera is a species of flower longhorn in the beetle family Cerambycidae. It is found in North America.

Subspecies
These three subspecies belong to the species Trachysida aspera:
 Trachysida aspera aspera (LeConte, 1873)
 Trachysida aspera brevifrons (Howden, 1959)
 Trachysida aspera rufescens Linsley & Chemsak, 1976

References

Further reading

External links

 

Lepturinae
Articles created by Qbugbot
Beetles described in 1873